The General Roman Calendar is the liturgical calendar that indicates the dates of celebrations of saints and mysteries of the Lord (Jesus Christ) in the Roman Rite of the Catholic Church, wherever this liturgical rite is in use. These celebrations are a fixed annual date, or occur on a particular day of the week. Examples are the Feast of the Baptism of the Lord in January and the Feast of Christ the King in November.

Others relate to the date of Easter. Examples are the celebrations of the Sacred Heart of Jesus and the Immaculate Heart of Mary. National and diocesan calendars, including that of the diocese of Rome itself as well as the calendars of religious institutes and even of continents, add other saints and mysteries or transfer the celebration of a particular saint or mystery from the date assigned in the General Calendar to another date.

These liturgical calendars indicate the degree or rank of each celebration: memorial (which can be merely optional), feast, or solemnity. Among other differences, the Gloria is said or sung at the Mass of a feast but not at that of a memorial. The Creed is added on solemnities.

The last general revision of the General Roman Calendar was in 1969 and was authorized by the motu proprio Mysterii Paschalis of Paul VI. The motu proprio and the decree of promulgation were included in the book Calendarium Romanum, published in the same year by Libreria Editrice Vaticana. This contained the official document Universal Norms on the Liturgical Year and the Calendar, and the list of celebrations of the General Roman Calendar. Both these documents are printed, in their present revised form, in the Roman Missal, after the General Instruction of the Roman Missal.

Selection of saints included
While canonization involves the addition of the saint's name to the Roman Martyrology, it does not necessarily involve the insertion of the saint's name into the General Roman Calendar, which mentions only a very limited selection of canonized saints. There is a common misconception that certain saints, (e.g., Christopher) were "unsainted" in 1969 or that veneration of them was "suppressed". Christopher is recognized as a saint of the Catholic Church, being listed as a martyr in the Roman Martyrology under 25 July. 

In 1969, Paul VI issued the motu proprio Mysterii Paschalis. In it, he recognized that, while the written Acts of Saint Christopher are merely legendary, attestations to the veneration of the martyr date from ancient times. His change in the calendar of saints included "leaving the memorial of Saint Christopher to local calendars", because of the relatively late date of its insertion into the Roman calendar.

Liturgical year
In the liturgical books, the document General Roman Calendar, which lists not only fixed celebrations but also some moveable ones, is printed immediately after the document Universal Norms on the Liturgical Year and the Calendar, which states that "throughout the course of the year the Church unfolds the entire mystery of Christ and observes the birthdays of the Saints". The birth of a saint to heaven is as a rule celebrated on a fixed day of the year. Sometimes they may be moved either to or from a Sunday. The mysteries of Christ are often celebrated on dates that always vary from year to year.

The Catholic Church's year combines two cycles of liturgical celebrations. One has been called the Proper of Time or Temporale, associated with the moveable date of Easter and the fixed date of Christmas. The other is associated with fixed calendar dates and has been called the Proper of Saints or Sanctorale. The General Roman Calendar includes celebrations that belong to the Proper of Time or Temporale and is not limited to those that make up the Proper of Saints or Sanctorale. An instance where two observances occur on the same date is called an occurrence.

Transfer of celebrations
Some celebrations listed in the General Roman Calendar are transferred to another date:

List of celebrations inscribed in the GRC

This list contains all celebrations currently inscribed in the General Roman Calendar. It is updated whenever the pope makes changes to the celebrations in the General Roman Calendar.

When no citation is provided for a particular celebration, it comes from Calendarium Romanum Generale (General Roman Calendar) as printed in the Latin original of Roman Missal, ed. typ. tertia (reimpressio emendata), released in 2008. Celebrations that are added or changed are cited from official decrees.

Celebration names are used from English Roman Missal (2018).

January

 1 January: Solemnity of Mary, the Holy Mother of God – solemnity
 2 January: Saints Basil the Great and Gregory Nazianzen, Bishops and Doctors of the Church – memorial
 3 January: The Most Holy Name of Jesus – optional memorial
 6 January: The Epiphany of the Lord – solemnity
 7 January: Saint Raymond of Penyafort, Priest – optional memorial
 13 January: Saint Hilary, Bishop and Doctor of the Church – optional memorial
 17 January: Saint Anthony, Abbot – memorial
 20 January: Saint Fabian, Pope and Martyr – optional memorial
 20 January: Saint Sebastian, Martyr – optional memorial
 21 January: Saint Agnes, Virgin and Martyr – memorial
 22 January: Saint Vincent, Deacon and Martyr – optional memorial
 24 January: Saint Francis de Sales, Bishop and Doctor of the Church – memorial
 25 January: The Conversion of Saint Paul the Apostle – feast
 26 January: Saints Timothy and Titus, Bishops – memorial
 27 January: Saint Angela Merici, Virgin – optional memorial
 28 January: Saint Thomas Aquinas, Priest and Doctor of the Church – memorial
 31 January: Saint John Bosco, Priest – memorial
 Sunday after 6 January: The Baptism of the Lord – feast

 The solemnity of Epiphany of the Lord is always celebrated on 6 January in the General Roman Calendar, however, in particular calendars, it might by transferred to Sunday on or after 6 January.
 When the solemnity of the Epiphany of the Lord is transferred to Sunday, which occurs on 7 or 8 January, the feast of the Baptism of the Lord is celebrated on the following Monday. (Ubi sollemnitas Epiphaniæ ad dominicam transfertur, quæ die 7 vel 8 ianuarii occurrit, festum Baptismatis Domini celebratur feria secunda sequenti.)

February

 2 February: The Presentation of the Lord – feast
 3 February: Saint Blaise, Bishop and Martyr – optional memorial
 3 February: Saint Ansgar, Bishop – optional memorial
 5 February: Saint Agatha, Virgin and Martyr – memorial
 6 February: Saints Paul Miki and Companions, Martyrs – memorial
 8 February: Saint Jerome Emiliani – optional memorial
 8 February: Saint Josephine Bakhita, Virgin – optional memorial
 10 February: Saint Scholastica, Virgin – memorial
 11 February: Our Lady of Lourdes – optional memorial
 14 February: Saints Cyril, Monk, and Methodius, Bishop – memorial
 17 February: The Seven Holy Founders of the Servite Order – optional memorial
 21 February: Saint Peter Damian, Bishop and Doctor of the Church – optional memorial
 22 February: The Chair of Saint Peter the Apostle – feast
 23 February: Saint Polycarp, Bishop and Martyr – memorial
 27 February: Saint Gregory of Narek, Abbot and Doctor of the Church – optional memorial

 On 25 January 2021, Pope Francis inscribed Saint Gregory of Narek, Abbot and Doctor of the Church, in the General Roman Calendar.

March

 4 March: Saint Casimir – optional memorial
 7 March: Saints Perpetua and Felicity, Martyrs – memorial
 8 March: Saint John of God, Religious – optional memorial
 9 March: Saint Frances of Rome, Religious – optional memorial
 17 March: Saint Patrick, Bishop – optional memorial
 18 March: Saint Cyril of Jerusalem, Bishop and Doctor of the Church – optional memorial
 19 March: Saint Joseph, Spouse of the Blessed Virgin Mary – solemnity
 23 March: Saint Turibius of Mongrovejo, Bishop – optional memorial
 25 March: The Annunciation of the Lord – solemnity

April

 2 April: Saint Francis of Paola, Hermit – optional memorial
 4 April: Saint Isidore, Bishop and Doctor of the Church – optional memorial
 5 April: Saint Vincent Ferrer, Priest – optional memorial
 7 April: Saint John Baptist de la Salle, Priest – memorial
 11 April: Saint Stanislaus, Bishop and Martyr – memorial
 13 April: Saint Martin I, Pope and Martyr – optional memorial
 21 April: Saint Anselm, Bishop and Doctor of the Church – optional memorial
 23 April: Saint George, Martyr – optional memorial
 23 April: Saint Adalbert, Bishop and Martyr – optional memorial
 24 April: Saint Fidelis of Sigmaringen, Priest and Martyr – optional memorial
 25 April: Saint Mark, Evangelist – feast
 28 April: Saint Peter Chanel, Priest and Martyr – optional memorial
 28 April: Saint Louis Grignon de Montfort, Priest – optional memorial
 29 April: Saint Catherine of Siena, Virgin and Doctor of the Church – memorial
 30 April: Saint Pius V, Pope – optional memorial

May

 1 May: Saint Joseph the Worker – optional memorial
 2 May: Saint Athanasius, Bishop and Doctor of the Church – memorial
 3 May: Saints Philip and James, Apostles – feast
10 May: Saint John of Ávila, Priest and Doctor of the Church – optional memorial
 12 May: Saints Nereus and Achilleus, Martyrs – optional memorial
 12 May: Saint Pancras, Martyr – optional memorial
 13 May: Our Lady of Fatima – optional memorial
 14 May: Saint Matthias, Apostle – feast
 18 May: Saint John I, Pope and Martyr – optional memorial
 20 May: Saint Bernardine of Siena, Priest – optional memorial
 21 May: Saint Christopher Magallanes, Priest, and Companions, Martyrs – optional memorial
 22 May: Saint Rita of Cascia, Religious – optional memorial
 25 May: Saint Bede the Venerable, Priest and Doctor of the Church – optional memorial
 25 May: Saint Gregory VII, Pope – optional memorial
 25 May: Saint Mary Magdalene de’ Pazzi, Virgin – optional memorial
 26 May: Saint Philip Neri, Priest – memorial
 27 May: Saint Augustine of Canterbury, Bishop – optional memorial
 29 May: Saint Paul VI, Pope – optional memorial
 31 May: The Visitation of the Blessed Virgin Mary – feast
 Monday after Pentecost: Blessed Virgin Mary, Mother of the Church – memorial
 First Sunday after Pentecost: The Most Holy Trinity – solemnity
 Thursday after Holy Trinity: The Most Holy Body and Blood of Christ – solemnity

 On 25 January 2021, Pope Francis inscribed Saint John of Avila, Priest and Doctor of the Church, in the General Roman Calendar.
 On 25 January 2019, Pope Francis inscribed Saint Paul VI, Pope, in the General Roman Calendar.
 On 11 February 2018, Pope Francis inscribed Blessed Virgin Mary, Mother of the Church, in the General Roman Calendar. In years when the memorial of the Mother of the Church coincides with another obligatory memorial, only the memorial of the Mother of the Church will be celebrated for that year.
 The solemnity of the Most Holy Body and Blood of Christ can be transferred to the following Sunday in particular calendars.

June

 1 June: Saint Justin, Martyr – memorial
 2 June: Saints Marcellinus and Peter, Martyrs – optional memorial
 3 June: Saints Charles Lwanga and Companions, Martyrs – memorial
 5 June: Saint Boniface, Bishop and Martyr – memorial
 6 June: Saint Norbert, Bishop – optional memorial
 9 June: Saint Ephrem, Deacon and Doctor of the Church – optional memorial
 11 June: Saint Barnabas, Apostle – memorial
 13 June: Saint Anthony of Padua, Priest and Doctor of the Church – memorial
 19 June: Saint Romuald, Abbot – optional memorial
 21 June: Saint Aloysius Gonzaga, Religious – memorial
 22 June: Saint Paulinus of Nola, Bishop – optional memorial
 22 June: Saints John Fisher, Bishop, and Thomas More, Martyrs – optional memorial
 24 June: The Nativity of Saint John the Baptist – solemnity
 27 June: Saint Cyril of Alexandria, Bishop and Doctor of the Church – optional memorial
 28 June: Saint Irenaeus, Bishop, Martyr and Doctor of the Church – memorial
 29 June: Saints Peter and Paul, Apostles – solemnity
 30 June: The First Martyrs of Holy Roman Church – optional memorial
 Friday after the Second Sunday after Pentecost: The Most Sacred Heart of Jesus – solemnity
 Saturday after the Second Sunday after Pentecost: The Immaculate Heart of the Blessed Virgin Mary – memorial

 The title Doctor of the Church was conferred to Saint Irenaeus by Pope Francis on 21 January 2022.
 In 2022, the solemnity of the Sacred Heart of Jesus coincided with the solemnity of the Nativity of John the Baptist. The Holy See kept the solemnity of the Sacred Heart on 24 June and brought forward the Nativity of John the Baptist to 23 June, except in locations where John the Baptist is the patron saint, where the reverse applied.
 In years when the memorial of the Immaculate Heart of the Blessed Virgin Mary coincides with another obligatory memorial, both must be considered optional for that year.

July

 3 July: Saint Thomas, Apostle – feast
 4 July: Saint Elizabeth of Portugal – optional memorial
 5 July: Saint Anthony Zaccaria, Priest – optional memorial
 6 July: Saint Maria Goretti, Virgin and Martyr – optional memorial
 9 July: Saint Augustine Zhao Rong, Priest, and Companions, Martyrs – optional memorial
 11 July: Saint Benedict, Abbot – memorial
 13 July: Saint Henry – optional memorial
 14 July: Saint Camillus de Lellis, Priest – optional memorial
 15 July: Saint Bonaventure, Bishop and Doctor of the Church – memorial
 16 July: Our Lady of Mount Carmel – optional memorial
 20 July: Saint Apollinaris, Bishop and Martyr – optional memorial
 21 July: Saint Lawrence of Brindisi, Priest and Doctor of the Church – optional memorial
 22 July: Saint Mary Magdalene – feast
 23 July: Saint Bridget, Religious – optional memorial
 24 July: Saint Sharbel Makhluf, Priest – optional memorial
 25 July: Saint James, Apostle – feast
 26 July: Saints Joachim and Anne, Parents of the Blessed Virgin Mary – memorial
 29 July: Saints Martha, Mary and Lazarus – memorial
 30 July: Saint Peter Chrysologus, Bishop and Doctor of the Church – optional memorial
 31 July: Saint Ignatius of Loyola, Priest – memorial

 Pope Francis raised the rank of the celebration of Saint Mary Magdalene to feast on 3 June 2016.
 Pope Francis decreed on 26 January 2021 that Saints Mary and Lazarus of Bethany are to be celebrated alongside of Saint Martha.

August

 1 August: Saint Alphonsus Liguori, Bishop and Doctor of the Church – memorial
 2 August: Saint Eusebius of Vercelli, Bishop – optional memorial
 2 August: Saint Peter Julian Eymard, Priest – optional memorial
 4 August: Saint Jean Vianney, Priest – memorial
 5 August: The Dedication of the Basilica of Saint Mary Major – optional memorial
 6 August: The Transfiguration of the Lord – feast
 7 August: Saint Sixtus II, Pope, and Companions, Martyrs – optional memorial
 7 August: Saint Cajetan, Priest – optional memorial
 8 August: Saint Dominic, Priest – memorial
 9 August: Saint Teresa Benedicta of the Cross, Virgin and Martyr – optional memorial
 10 August: Saint Lawrence, Deacon and Martyr – feast
 11 August: Saint Clare, Virgin – memorial
 12 August: Saint Jane Frances de Chantal, Religious – optional memorial
 13 August: Saints Pontian, Pope, and Hippolytus, Priest, Martyrs – optional memorial
 14 August: Saint Maximilian Kolbe, Priest and Martyr – memorial
 15 August: The Assumption of the Blessed Virgin Mary – solemnity
 16 August: Saint Stephen of Hungary – optional memorial
 19 August: Saint John Eudes, Priest – optional memorial
 20 August: Saint Bernard, Abbot and Doctor of the Church – memorial
 21 August: Saint Pius X, Pope – memorial
 22 August: The Queenship of the Blessed Virgin Mary – memorial
 23 August: Saint Rose of Lima, Virgin – optional memorial
 24 August: Saint Bartholomew, Apostle – feast
 25 August: Saint Louis – optional memorial
 25 August: Saint Joseph Calasanz, Priest – optional memorial
 27 August: Saint Monica – memorial
 28 August: Saint Augustine of Hippo, Bishop and Doctor of the Church – memorial
 29 August: The Passion of Saint John the Baptist, Martyr – memorial

September

 3 September: Saint Gregory the Great, Pope and Doctor of the Church – memorial
 8 September: The Nativity of the Blessed Virgin Mary – feast
 9 September: Saint Peter Claver, Priest – optional memorial
 12 September: The Most Holy Name of Mary – optional memorial
 13 September: Saint John Chrysostom, Bishop and Doctor of the Church – memorial
 14 September: The Exaltation of the Holy Cross – feast
 15 September: Our Lady of Sorrows – memorial
 16 September: Saints Cornelius, Pope, and Cyprian, Bishop, Martyrs – memorial
 17 September: Saint Robert Bellarmine, Bishop and Doctor of the Church – optional memorial
 17 September: Saint Hildegard of Bingen, Virgin and Doctor of the Church – optional memorial
 19 September: Saint Januarius, Bishop and Martyr – optional memorial
 20 September: Saints Andrew Kim Tae-gon, Priest, Paul Chong Ha-sang, and Companions, Martyrs – memorial
 21 September: Saint Matthew, Apostle and Evangelist – feast
 23 September: Saint Pius of Pietrelcina, Priest – memorial
 26 September: Saints Cosmas and Damian, Martyrs – optional memorial
 27 September: Saint Vincent de Paul, Priest – memorial
 28 September: Saint Wenceslaus, Martyr – optional memorial
 28 September: Saint Lawrence Ruiz and Companions, Martyrs – optional memorial
 29 September: Saints Michael, Gabriel and Raphael, Archangels – feast
 30 September: Saint Jerome, Priest and Doctor of the Church – memorial

 On 25 January 2021, Pope Francis inscribed Saint Hildegard of Bingen, Virgin and Doctor of the Church, in the General Roman Calendar.

October

 1 October: Saint Thérèse of the Child Jesus, Virgin and Doctor of the Church – memorial
 2 October: The Holy Guardian Angels – memorial
 4 October: Saint Francis of Assisi – memorial
 5 October: Saint Faustina Kowalska, Virgin – optional memorial
 6 October: Saint Bruno, Priest – optional memorial
 7 October: Our Lady of the Rosary – memorial
 9 October: Saint Denis, Bishop, and Companions, Martyrs – optional memorial
 9 October: Saint John Leonardi, Priest – optional memorial
 11 October: Saint John XXIII, Pope – optional memorial
 14 October: Saint Callistus I, Pope and Martyr – optional memorial
 15 October: Saint Teresa of Jesus, Virgin and Doctor of the Church – memorial
 16 October: Saint Hedwig, Religious – optional memorial
 16 October: Saint Margaret Mary Alacoque, Virgin – optional memorial
 17 October: Saint Ignatius of Antioch, Bishop and Martyr – memorial
 18 October: Saint Luke, Evangelist – feast
 19 October: Saints John de Brébeuf, Isaac Jogues, Priests, and Companions, Martyrs – optional memorial
 19 October: Saint Paul of the Cross, Priest – optional memorial
 22 October: Saint John Paul II, Pope – optional memorial
 23 October: Saint John of Capistrano, Priest – optional memorial
 24 October: Saint Anthony Mary Claret, Bishop – optional memorial
 28 October: Saints Simon and Jude, Apostles – feast

 On 18 May 2020, Pope Francis inscribed Saint Faustina Kowalska, Virgin, in the General Roman Calendar.
 On 29 May 2014, Pope Francis inscribed Saint John XXIII, Pope, in the General Roman Calendar.
 On 29 May 2014, Pope Francis inscribed Saint John Paul II, Pope, in the General Roman Calendar.

November

 1 November: All Saints – solemnity
 2 November: The Commemoration of All the Faithful Departed – ranked with solemnities
 3 November: Saint Martin de Porres, Religious – optional memorial
 4 November: Saint Charles Borromeo, Bishop – memorial
 9 November: The Dedication of the Lateran Basilica – feast
 10 November: Saint Leo the Great, Pope and Doctor of the Church – memorial
 11 November: Saint Martin of Tours, Bishop – memorial
 12 November: Saint Josaphat, Bishop and Martyr – memorial
 15 November: Saint Albert the Great, Bishop and Doctor of the Church – optional memorial
 16 November: Saint Margaret of Scotland – optional memorial
 16 November: Saint Gertrude, Virgin – optional memorial
 17 November: Saint Elizabeth of Hungary, Religious – memorial
 18 November: The Dedication of the Basilicas of Saints Peter and Paul, Apostles – optional memorial
 21 November: The Presentation of the Blessed Virgin Mary – memorial
 22 November: Saint Cecilia, Virgin and Martyr – memorial
 23 November: Saint Clement I, Pope and Martyr – optional memorial
 23 November: Saint Columban, Abbot – optional memorial
 24 November: Saints Andrew Dung-Lac, Priest, and Companions, Martyrs – memorial
 25 November: Saint Catherine of Alexandria, Virgin and Martyr – optional memorial
 30 November: Saint Andrew, Apostle – feast
 Last Sunday in Ordinary Time: Our Lord Jesus Christ, King of the Universe – solemnity

December

 3 December: Saint Francis Xavier, Priest – memorial
 4 December: Saint John Damascene, Priest and Doctor of the Church – optional memorial
 6 December: Saint Nicholas, Bishop – optional memorial
 7 December: Saint Ambrose, Bishop and Doctor of the Church – memorial
 8 December: The Immaculate Conception of the Blessed Virgin Mary – solemnity
 9 December: Saint Juan Diego Cuauhtlatoatzin – optional memorial
 10 December: Our Lady of Loreto – optional memorial
 11 December: Saint Damasus I, Pope – optional memorial
 12 December: Our Lady of Guadalupe – optional memorial
 13 December: Saint Lucy, Virgin and Martyr – memorial
 14 December: Saint John of the Cross, Priest and Doctor of the Church – memorial
 21 December: Saint Peter Canisius, Priest and Doctor of the Church – optional memorial
 23 December: Saint John of Kanty, Priest – optional memorial
 25 December: Nativity of the Lord – solemnity
 26 December: Saint Stephen, the First Martyr – feast
 27 December: Saint John, Apostle and Evangelist – feast
 28 December: The Holy Innocents, Martyrs – feast
 29 December: Saint Thomas Becket, Bishop and Martyr – optional memorial
 31 December: Saint Sylvester I, Pope – optional memorial
 Sunday within the Octave of Christmas, or, if there is no such Sunday, 30 December: The Holy Family of Jesus, Mary and Joseph – feast

 On 31 October 2019, Pope Francis inscribed Our Lady of Loreto in the General Roman Calendar.

Particular calendars 

The General Calendar is printed, for instance, in the Roman Missal and the Liturgy of the Hours. These are up to date when printed, but additional feasts may be added later. For that reason, if those celebrating the liturgy have not inserted into the books a note about the changes, they must consult the current annual publication, known as the "Ordo", for their country or religious congregation. 

These annual publications, like those that, disregarding the feasts that are obligatory in the actual church where the liturgy is celebrated, list only celebrations included in the General Calendar, are useful only for the current year, since they omit celebrations impeded because of falling on a Sunday or during periods such as Holy Week and the Octave of Easter.

This distinction is made in application of the decision of the Second Vatican Council: "Lest the feasts of the saints should take precedence over the feasts which commemorate the very mysteries of salvation, many of them should be left to be celebrated by a particular Church or nation or family of religious; only those should be extended to the universal Church which commemorate saints who are truly of universal importance."

Institutional and societal calendars

National calendars

Personal jurisdiction calendars

Diocesan and parish calendars 
The calendar for a diocese is typically based on a national calendar, with a few additions. For instance, the anniversary of the dedication of the cathedral is celebrated as a solemnity in the cathedral church and as a feast in all the other churches of the diocese. The feast day of the principal patron saint of the diocese is celebrated as a feast throughout the diocese.

See also

 Calendar of saints
 Institutional and societal calendars of the Roman Rite
 National calendars of the Roman Rite
 Personal jurisdiction calendars of the Roman Rite
 Ranking of liturgical days in the Roman Rite

References

Further reading

External links
 
 

Liturgical calendars of the Catholic Church
 
Roman Rite
Sacred places and times in Catholic canon law
Catholic liturgical law